Feast Eternal is an American Christian melodic death metal band from Traverse City, Michigan, United States. The band was originally formed in 1992. The band has released two full length studio albums and one EP to date.  In 2006 Feast Eternal re-released their 1999, Prisons of Flesh, with 2 new bonus tracks.  Their last release was a 4 song EP, Forward Through Blood, in 2013 which received a rating of 8.5 from the website PowerMetal.de (2014)

Members 
Current
 T.J. Humlinski – Vocals, guitar (1992–present)
 Matt Skrzypczak – Drums (1993–present)

Former
 Aaron Byrnes – Guitar, bass guitar, backing vocals (2011-2014)
 John Greenman - Bass guitar (1992-1996), rhythm guitar (1997-2000)
 Josh Potrafka - Bass guitar (1997-2000)

Discography 

 Prisons of Flesh (1999)
 With Fire (2007)
 Prisons of Flesh (re-release with two bonus songs) (2006)
 Forward Through Blood (2013)

References

External links
 Feast Eternal on Facebook
 Feast Eternal Interview | Metal Pulse Radio

Musical groups established in 1992
Death metal musical groups from Michigan
American melodic death metal musical groups
American Christian metal musical groups
Heavy metal duos
American musical trios
Musical quartets
Christian extreme metal groups